Events from the year 1330 in the Kingdom of Scotland.

Incumbents
Monarch – David II

Events
 25 August – James Douglas, Lord of Douglas killed while fighting in Spain

See also

 Timeline of Scottish history

References

 
Years of the 14th century in Scotland
Wars of Scottish Independence